George Aloys "Showboat" Fisher (January 16, 1899 – May 15, 1994) was a baseball player who played in the 1930 World Series with the St. Louis Cardinals. He had a .335 lifetime batting average (114-for-340) in Major League Baseball with 8 home runs and 71 RBI in 138 games. He played several games for the racially integrated Jamestown Red Sox in 1934 under the management of Ted Radcliffe.

He was the last surviving member of the 1924 Washington Senators, the last DC team to win the World Series, until the Nationals won in 2019.

References
'1934 Jamestown Red Sox', Pitch Black Baseball (2005) Retrieved August 28, 2005.

External links

1899 births
1994 deaths
Major League Baseball right fielders
St. Louis Browns players
St. Louis Cardinals players
Washington Senators (1901–1960) players
Buffalo Bisons (minor league) players
Baseball players from Iowa
People from Kossuth County, Iowa
Nashville Vols players